Emmanuel Ebenezer Nglass was the Anglican Bishop of Uyo in Niger Delta Province of the Church of Nigeria from 1990 until 2005.

Nglass was born on 3 January 1947. He attended Government Teacher Training College, Ikot Obio Itong (1971–74),  College of Education, Uyo (1975–78) and graduated from the University of Nigeria, Nsukka in 1982 with a BA in Education. He attended Trinity Union Theological College, Umuahia (1983–84) and the University of lbadan (1985–86).

He was a lecturer at the College of Education, Uyo (1982–83) and at the University of Cross River State, Uyo (1984–90). He was Archdeacon of Uyo from 1984 until 1990 when he became the pioneer Bishop of Uyo. He became Archbishop of Niger Delta Province. He had retired from both posts by 2007.

He died in 2016.

References 

1947 births
2016 deaths
Anglican bishops of Uyo
Anglican archbishops of Niger Delta
21st-century Anglican bishops in Nigeria
20th-century Anglican bishops in Nigeria
Nigerian Anglicans
Academic staff of the University of Uyo
University of Ibadan alumni
Trinity Theological College, Umuahia alumni
University of Nigeria alumni